Austria competed at the 1980 Summer Olympics in Moscow, USSR. 83 competitors, 64 men and 19 women, took part in 51 events in 16 sports.

Medalists

Archery

In its second appearance in archery competition at the Olympics, Austria again entered only one man.

Men's Individual Competition:
 Peter Mitterer — 2336 points (→ 21st place)

Athletics

Men's 1,500 metres
Robert Nemeth
 Heat — 3:38.3
 Semifinals — 3:40.8 (→ did not advance)

Men's 5,000 metres
 Dietmar Millonig
 Heat — 13:45.7
 Semi Final — 13:29.4
 Final — 13:23.3 (→ 6th place)

Men's Marathon
 Josef Steiner
 Final — 2:24:24 (→ 39th place)

Men's 3,000 m Steeplechase
 Wolfgang Konrad
 Heat — 8:35.3 
 Semifinals — 8:25.0 (→ did not advance)

Men's 20 km Walk
Martin Toporek
 Final — 1:44:56.0 (→ 21st place)
Johann Siegele
 Final — 1:45:17.8 (→ 22nd place)
Wilfried Siegele
 Final — DSQ (→ no ranking)

Men's Long Jump
 William Rea
 Qualification — 7.74 m (→ did not advance)

Men's Decathlon
 Georg Werthner
 Final — 8050 points (→ 4th place)
 Sepp Zeilbauer
 Final — 8007 points (→ 5th place)

Boxing

Canoeing

Cycling

Six cyclists represented Austria in 1980.

Individual road race
 Herbert Spindler
 Johann Traxler
 Johann Lienhart
 Kurt Zellhofer

Team time trial
 Johann Lienhart
 Peter Muckenhuber
 Herbert Spindler
 Johann Summer

Diving

Men's Springboard
 Niki Stajković
 Preliminary Round — 521.04 points (→ 12th place, did not advance)
 Kenneth Grove
 Heats — 491.94 points (→ 15th place, did not advance)
 Michael Worisch
 Preliminary Round — 452.43 points (→ 21st place, did not advance)

Men's Platform
 Niki Stajković
 Preliminary Round — 493.89 points (→ 7th place)
 Final — 725.145 points (→ 8th place)
 Kenneth Grove
 Preliminary Round — 447.12 points (→ 12th place, did not advance)

Equestrian

Hockey

Women's Team Competition
 Preliminary Round Robin
 Lost to India (0-2) 
 Defeated Soviet Union (2-0)
 Defeated Poland (3-0)
 Lost to Czechoslovakia (0-5)
 Lost to Zimbabwe (1-4) → 5th place
Team Roster:
 Patricia Lorenz
 Sabine Blemenschütz
 Elisabeth Pistauer
 Andrea Kozma
 Brigitta Pecanka
 Brigitte Kindler
 Friederike Stern
 Regina Lorenz
 Eleonore Pecanka
 Ilse Stipanovsky
 Andrea Porsch
 Erika Csar
 Dorit Ganster
 Ulrike Kleinhansl
 Eva Cambal
 Jana Cejpek

Judo

Modern pentathlon

Two male pentathletes represented Austria in 1980.

Individual Competition:
 Alexander Topay — 4784 points (→ 35th place)
 Helmut Wieser — 4582 points (→ 38th place)

Rowing

Sailing

Open

Shooting

Open

Swimming

Men's 100m Freestyle
 Herwig Bayer
 Heats — 52.79 (→ did not advance, 22nd place)

Men's 100m Backstroke
 Herwig Bayer
 Heats — (→ did not advance, 20th place)

Men's 100m Butterfly
 Kurt Dittrich
 Heats — (→ did not advance, 21st place)

Women's 100m Freestyle
 Heidi Koch
 Heats — (→ did not advance, 19th place)

Women's 100m Backstroke
 Marianne Humpelstetter
 Heats — (→ did not advance, 21st place)
 
Women's 100m Butterfly
 Sonja Hausladen
 Heats — (→ 16th place)
 
Women's 200m Butterfly
 Sonja Hausladen
 Heats — (→ 12th place)

Weightlifting

Wrestling

References

External links
 Austrian Olympic Committee
sports-reference

Nations at the 1980 Summer Olympics
1980 Summer Olympics
Summer Olympics